Pacharanamon Nonthapa (born 20 December 1993), nicknamed Eiw, is a Thai television actress. He is best known for her lead roles acting in the series The Legend of King Naresuan: The Series (2016)

Biography 
She started working in the entertainment industry during her studies at Srinakharinwirot University During the Freshman, which was the Miss Gossip Girl 2012, and second place was awarded the opportunity to sign a contract with the MONO. Then began to take picture on a magazine. And a scout host. And later, she played the role in Thai series, The Legendary Outlaw as Tan Sai, and Princess Suphankanlaya in Thai historical action series. The Legend of King Naresuan: The Series

Filmography

Film
 Hor Taew Tak 5

Television series

Music Video
 Kod Lew Nai Duang Jai perform by Takkatan Chonlada

References

External links 

Pacharanamon Nonthapa
Pacharanamon Nonthapa
1993 births
Living people
Pacharanamon Nonthapa
Pacharanamon Nonthapa